FWCI may refer to:

 Fort William Collegiate Institute
 Field-weighted Citation Impact, an author-level metric used by Scopus SciVal
 Flat Water Canoe Instructor from Cadet Instructors Cadre